In mathematics, a solid torus is the topological space formed by sweeping a disk around a circle. It is homeomorphic to the Cartesian product  of the disk and the circle, endowed with the product topology.

A standard way to visualize a solid torus is as a toroid, embedded in 3-space. However, it should be distinguished from a torus, which has the same visual appearance: the torus is the two-dimensional space on the boundary of a toroid, while the solid torus includes also the compact interior space enclosed by the torus.

Topological properties

The solid torus is a connected, compact, orientable 3-dimensional manifold with boundary.

Since the disk  is contractible, the solid torus has the homotopy type of a circle, . Therefore the fundamental group and homology groups are isomorphic to those of the circle:

See also

Cheerios
Hyperbolic Dehn surgery
Reeb foliation
Whitehead manifold
Donut

References

3-manifolds